The Town and Country Predators are a Grand Bahama Football League club currently placed in Lucaya, Bahamas.

Football clubs in the Bahamas